TMMK can refer to:

T-Mobile Macedonia – Former name of Makedonski Telekom, a wireless operator in North Macedonia
Tamil Nadu Muslim Munnetra Kazagham - A non-governmental organisation based in Tamil Nadu
Toyota Motor Manufacturing Kentucky - A Toyota operation in Kentucky